Eric Margolis may refer to:

Eric Margolis (journalist) (born 1942/43), American journalist
Eric Margolis (sociologist) (born 1947), American sociologist